In mechanical engineering, a docking sleeve or mounting boss is a tube or enclosure used to couple two mechanical components together, or for chilling, or to retain two components together; this permits two equally sized appendages to be connected via insertion and fixing within the construction. Docking sleeves may be physically solid or flexible, their implementation varying widely according to the required application of the device. The most common application is the plastic appendage that receives a screw in order to attach two parts.

References

Mechanical engineering